The following numbers characterize the area of Poland
 Area of Polish territory -  (land area, internal waters area and territorial sea area)
 Administrative area of Poland - . This is calculated according to the official definition of the coastline. Some of Polish administrative units include area of internal waters (8 communes in voivodeship zachodniopomorskie, 2 communes in Pomerania Voivodeship and 3 communes in Warmia-Mazuria Voivodeship). That is why the administrative area of Poland isn't the same as the area of Poland. By common convention  is called the (total) area of Poland in encyclopedias and other sources.
 Area of Poland (land area of Poland) - . Land area includes land waters (lakes, rivers, canals) and this figure is normally used when comparing the area of Poland with the area of other countries.

See also
Administrative division of Poland
Geography of Poland
Territorial changes of Poland

References

Geography of Poland